Konrad Stein (26 March 1892 – 15 November 1960) was a German wrestler. He competed in the featherweight event at the 1912 Summer Olympics.

References

External links
 

1892 births
1960 deaths
Olympic wrestlers of Germany
Wrestlers at the 1912 Summer Olympics
German male sport wrestlers
People from Aschaffenburg
Sportspeople from Lower Franconia